Mount Hanssen is an ice-covered mountain distinguished by a sharp peak,  high, standing at the southernmost point of Rawson Plateau in the Queen Maud Mountains of Antarctica. It was discovered by Captain Roald Amundsen while en route to the South Pole in November 1911, and named by him for Helmer Hanssen, deputy leader of the South Pole party.

References

Mountains of the Ross Dependency
Amundsen Coast